No Remorse may refer to:

 No Remorse (Motörhead album), 1984
 No Remorse (band), a British neo-Nazi rock band formed in 1986
 "No Remorse" (song), a song on the 1983 Metallica album Kill 'Em All
 "No Remorse (I Wanna Die)", a song by Slayer and Atari Teenage Riot on the 1997 Spawn sountrack album
 No Remorse Records, a German heavy metal record label
 Crusader: No Remorse, the first title in the action video game series Crusader (game series)
 No Remorse (Tokyo Blade album), 1989
 Jesse Stone: No Remorse, 2010 American television mystery film